Alberto Minetti (born 18 May 1957) is an Italian former cyclist. He competed in the individual road race and team time trial events at the 1980 Summer Olympics.

References

External links
 

1957 births
Living people
People from Ceva
Italian male cyclists
Olympic cyclists of Italy
Cyclists at the 1980 Summer Olympics
Cyclists from Piedmont
Sportspeople from the Province of Cuneo